The slender barb or longbeard barb (Enteromius unitaeniatus) is a species of ray-finned fish in the genus Enteromius which has a wide distribution from the Democratic Republic of the Congo to South Africa.

Footnotes 

 

Enteromius
Cyprinid fish of Africa
Fish described in 1866
Taxa named by Albert Günther